Edward "Ted" Ladd Widmer (born 1963) is an American historian, writer, librarian, and musician who served as a speechwriter in the Clinton White House.

He serves on boards of the Harvard Lampoon, Massachusetts Historical Society and The New England Quarterly.

Early life and education  
Edward Ladd Widmer was born in 1963 to Ellen and Eric Widmer. He attended the Moses Brown School in Providence, Rhode Island, graduating in 1980. Widmer subsequently attended Harvard University where he obtained an A.B., A.M., and Ph.D. in the history and literature of France and the United States. During his time at Harvard, he was an editor at the school's humor magazine, The Harvard Lampoon.

In 1990, Widmer's research on the origin of baseball was featured in The New York Times.

In 1992 Widmer married Mary Frederica Rhinelander, a printmaker and figurative artist. Widmer was appointed a lecturer on history and literature at Harvard University in 1993 and worked in that capacity until 1997. Between 1995 until 1997, he played guitar and vocals in a Boston hard rock band, the Upper Crust.

Career  
From 1997 to 2001, he worked in the White House as a special assistant to President Bill Clinton, foreign policy speech writer and Senior Advisor for Special Projects, which involved advising on history and scholarship related issues. He later conducted extensive interviews with Clinton while the former president was writing his autobiography.

In 2001, Widmer was appointed the inaugural director of the C.V. Starr Center for the Study of the American Experience at Washington College. From 2001 to 2006, he served concurrently as an associate professor of history at the college. During his tenure, Widmer established the George Washington Book Prize, an annual award for literature on the founding era of the United States.

On July 1, 2006 Widmer was appointed Director and Librarian of the John Carter Brown Library at Brown University. At the library, he led efforts to digitize the library's holdings and raised funding to save Haitian libraries in the wake of the 2010 earthquake. From 2012 to 2013, Widmer was a senior advisor to U.S. Secretary of State Hillary Clinton. Between 2010 and 2015, he helped to create and often contributed to The New York Times''' series "Disunion," which focused on the Civil War.

In October, 2016, Widmer was appointed Director of the John W. Kluge Center at the Library of Congress.

In 2018, he joined the faculty of Macaulay Honors College as a lecturer where he has led courses on Walt Whitman and The People of New York.

Books

 Young America: The Flowering of Democracy in New York City (1999) (winner of the 2001 Washington Irving Prize)
 Campaigns: A Century of Presidential Races (2001) (co-author with Alan Brinkley)
 Martin Van Buren (2004)
 Ark of the Liberties: America and the World (2008) (a history of U.S. foreign policy)
 Listening In: The Secret White House Recordings of John F. Kennedy (2012) (co-author with Caroline Kennedy)
 Brown: The History of an Idea (2015)
 New York Times: Disunion: A History of the Civil War (2016) (co-editor with Clay Risen and George Kalogerakis)
 Lincoln on the Verge: Thirteen Days to Washington (2020) (winner of The Lincoln Forum Book Prize in 2020)

References

External links

C-SPAN Q&A interview with Widmer about Listening In, November 25, 2012
New York Times Opinion Pieces:
“1919: The Year of the Crack-Up” 
"What Did Plato Think the Earth Looked Like?” 
"The War That Never Ended” 
"Why Two Black Athletes Raised Their Fists During the Anthem”

Historians of the United States
21st-century American historians
21st-century American male writers
Brown University faculty
Clinton administration personnel
The Harvard Lampoon alumni
Living people
1963 births
American male non-fiction writers